The National Museum of Rio de Janeiro collections include an exhibition of Mediterranean antiquities from Etruscan, Greek (Italiote) and Roman civilizations.

The current status of the collection is unknown after the fire that destroyed the museum in 2018.

See also 

 National Museum of Brazil

References